The Exterminators is a 1965 spy film directed by Riccardo Freda. It was the fourth in the Francis Coplan series of films. It was released in the United Kingdom as The Exterminators and on television in the United States as FX 18 Superspy.

Cast
 Richard Stapley as Coplan
 Robert Manuel as Hartung
 Jany Clair as Héléna Jordan
 Valeria Ciangottini as Gelda
 Maria-Rosa Rodriguez as Sheila

Production
The Exterminators was the second film director Riccardo Freda made for Comptoir Français du Film Production (C.F.F.P.). Producer Robert de Nesle's idea of for the film was to adapt Gérard de Villiers' popular S.A.S. novels, but he could not obtain the rights. This led to Freda making the fourth film in the Coplan series.  The Coplan films were based on novels by Belgian writers Gaston Van den Panhuyse and Jean Libert. The lead in the film was Richard Stapley, who spoke positively about working with the director, describing him as "a very good director whom everyone thought should be working on much better things than this lowbudget spy film."

The film was filmed on location in Korem, Turkey and Paris between 24 June and 9 August 1965. Two endings for the film were shot, one with Coplan ending up with a girl played by De Nesle's girlfriend at the time. Stapley described her acting in the scene as "so inept that the scene couldn't be used."

Release
The Exterminators was distributed theatrically by C.F.F.P. in France on 11 October 1965 with a 96-minute running time. It was later distributed theatrically by Fida Cinematografica in Italy as Agente 777 missione Summergame with an 83-minute running time. The film did not receive a theatrical release in the United States, but played on television in Los Angeles in 1968 as FX 18 Superspy.

Reception
From contemporary reviews, Monthly Film Bulletin noted that "locations [were] used to imaginative effect", that the action scenes were "vividly staged", and that "it shows that Freda can do for the spy-frolic what he did for Dr. Hichcock and the swashbuckler spectacular." The review concluded that the film would make reviewers "momentarily forget the material is so indifferent" and "Freda almost managed to pull off an entertaining thriller." In France, s reviewer said, "two or three gadgets and as many private jokes are not enough to save an insignificant mise-en-scène at the service of a stupid story."

References

Footnotes

Sources

External links
 

French spy thriller films
Italian spy thriller films
Films directed by Riccardo Freda
Films shot in Paris
Films shot in Turkey
1960s spy thriller films
1960s Italian films
1960s French films